István Nikolits (born 24 June 1946) is a Hungarian politician, who served as Minister of Civilian Intelligence Services of Hungary between 1995 and 1998.

References
 Biográf ki kicsoda (Budapest, 2003)
 Bölöny, József – Hubai, László: Magyarország kormányai 1848–2004 [Cabinets of Hungary 1848–2004], Akadémiai Kiadó, Budapest, 2004 (5th edition).

1946 births
Living people
Secret ministers of Hungary
Hungarian Socialist Party politicians